USS Oceanus (ARB-2) was planned as a United States Navy , but was redesignated as one of twelve Aristaeus-class battle damage repair ships built for the United States Navy during World War II. Named for Oceanus (believed to be the world-ocean in classical antiquity), she was the only US Naval vessel to bear the name.

Construction
The ship was laid down as LST–328 on 12 November 1942, at the Philadelphia Navy Yard; redesignated ARB-2 on 25 January 1943, she was then launched on 11 February 1943, and commissioned on 22 May 1943.

Service history
Following shakedown in Chesapeake Bay, Oceanus departed Norfolk, Virginia on 23 July 1943 for the Pacific, arriving at Nouméa, New Caledonia 18 September. She remained there, converting LCIs to shoal-draft gunboats and making emergency repairs to damaged vessels. On 28 October, she shifted to Espiritu Santo, thence, departing on 1 July 1944, to Florida Island. On 9 September 1944, she departed the Solomon Islands in TG 31.4 and on 20 September, arrived at Kossol Roads, Palaus. There she repaired, often while underway, craft and vessels damaged in the assaults against those islands and against the Philippines. In February 1945, she steamed to Guam to join TG 51.5 for the Iwo Jima invasion, arriving on 20 February, and remaining until 17 March.
 
The Okinawa campaign next took Oceanus to Kerama Retto, where work on ships damaged by kamikazes and bombs kept her on a round-the-clock schedule into mid-May. On 14 May, she shifted to the Hagushi anchorage for emergency repairs to the battleship . Completing the work and returning to Kerama Retto's "Scrap Iron Row" on 21 May, she remained until early June when she steamed to the Philippines.

Arriving at Leyte 15 June, she remained in San Pedro Bay until after the end of the War.

Post-war
Post-war duties took her to Okinawa, then to China. At Shanghai from October into December, she serviced landing and patrol craft assigned to China Group. On 25 December, she headed back to the United States to prepare for inactivation. Decommissioned 15 January 1947, she was berthed at San Diego, as a unit of the Pacific Reserve Fleet until struck from the Naval Vessel Register 1 July 1961, and sold 3 May 1962 to Zidell Exploration of Portland, Oregon for scrapping.

Awards
Oceanus earned one battle stars for World War II service.

Notes

Citations

Bibliography 

Online resources
 
 

Aristaeus-class repair ships
Aristaeus-class repair ships converted from LST-1-class ships
Ships built in Philadelphia
1943 ships
World War II auxiliary ships of the United States
Pacific Reserve Fleet, San Diego